"Didn't I (Blow Your Mind This Time)" is a song co-written by record producer Thom Bell and William Hart, lead singer of the American R&B/Soul vocal group the Delfonics. It was released by the group in 1969 on the Philly Groove record label and is regarded as a classic, winning a Grammy Award for Best R&B Vocal Performance by a Duo or Group.

It is considered one of the most notable early Philly soul singles and typical of the genre, "Didn't I" is a slow love ballad, with layered strings, horns, and chromatic production.

Among the Delfonics' signature songs, "Didn't I (Blow Your Mind This Time)" was a number 3 hit on the Billboard R&B singles chart, and number 10 on the Billboard pop chart in 1970.  
The song peaked at number 81 in Australia.

Overseas the song peaked at number 22 on the UK Singles Chart in 1971.

New Kids on the Block cover

A pop version by New Kids on the Block was featured on the group's 1986 self-titled debut album. The song was later released as a stand-alone single during the group's Hangin' Tough era in an attempt to heighten the profile of the album it was from. Their cover of the song, slightly re-titled "Didn't I (Blow Your Mind)", peaked at number eight on both the US and UK pop charts; in the US, in November 1989; in the UK, a year later in October 1990 as a double A-side with "Let's Try It Again".

Track listing
Europe 12" vinyl
A "Didn't I (Blow Your Mind)" – 4:24
B "New Kids on the Block" – 3:20

Charts

Weekly charts

The Delfonics

Year-end charts

New Kids on the Block

Other covers
The song has been extensively covered since 1970, with versions by Aretha Franklin (from Young, Gifted and Black in 1971), brothers David and Jimmy Ruffin, Lisa Fischer, Regina Belle, Jackie Jackson,  the Trammps, Maxine Nightingale and Patti LaBelle.

Millie Jackson version peaked number 49 in the Billboard Hot R&B/Hip-Hop Songs chart.

Daryl Hall and Todd Rundgren covered this song in Episode 40 of Live From Daryl's House.

In popular culture 
The song drives the plot of the 1997 film Jackie Brown and was included on its soundtrack. In the film, the male lead, Max (played by Robert Forster) first hears the song on a vinyl record when he visits the titular character, and later buys the cassette version of the same album, which he plays in his car as his affection for Jackie Brown grows.

The song also appears in the 2021 film The Many Saints of Newark.

References

External links
 
 

1969 singles
1970 singles
1989 singles
The Delfonics songs
New Kids on the Block songs
Aretha Franklin songs
Patti LaBelle songs
Maxine Nightingale songs
Songs written by Thom Bell
Columbia Records singles
Song recordings produced by Maurice Starr
Songs written by William Hart (singer)
Bell Records singles
Philly Groove Records singles
1969 songs
1960s ballads